Alebtong District is a district in the Northern Region of Uganda. The town of Alebtong is the site of the district headquarters.

Location
Alebtong District is located in the Lango sub-region. The district is bordered by Otuke District to the north, Amuria District to the east, Dokolo District to the south, and Lira District to the west. The coordinates of the district are 02 18N, 33 18E...

Overview
Alebtong District was formed in 2010. Before then, it was part of Lira District. The district is made up of two counties, namely Ajuri County and Moroto County.

Population
In 1991, the national population census estimated the population of the district at 112,584. The 2002 national census estimated the population to be 163,047. The 2014 national population census enumerated the population at 225,327.

See also
 Districts of Uganda

References

External links
  Alebtong District Homepage

 
Lango sub-region
Districts of Uganda
Northern Region, Uganda